The first Basque immigrants to Oregon arrived in the 1880s. Most were sheepherders who had migrated north from California and Nevada. Areas of Basque settlement include Arock and Jordan Valley in Malheur County, Oregon and a smaller number in Harney County. The Basque migration peaked in the 1920s and 1930s, only beginning to undergo decline in the 1940s. By the end of the 20th century, the Basque population shifted and now many live in eastern Oregon and the Portland metropolitan area.

See also
 Basque, Oregon
 Pelota Fronton

References

External links
Jordan Valley, Home of the Basques
Basque People Arrive in the New World
Basque Americans in the Columbia River Basin

 
1920s in Oregon
1930s in Oregon